Lukas Ripley (born 15 April 2002) is an Australian rugby union player who plays for the  in Super Rugby. His playing position is centre. He was named in the Rebels wider-training squad for the 2022 Super Rugby Pacific season.

Super Rugby statistics

Reference list

External links
itsrugby.co.uk profile

Australian rugby union players
Living people
Rugby union centres
Melbourne Rebels players
2002 births